This is a list of shopping malls in Serbia.

Shopping malls
The list of shopping malls in Serbia with total gross leasable area (GLA) in square metres (m2):

Retail parks
The list of retail parks in Serbia with total gross leasable area (GLA) in square metres (m2):

Outlet centers
The list of outlet centers in Serbia with total gross leasable area (GLA) in square metres (m2):

See also
List of supermarket chains in Serbia

References

Serbia
Shopping malls